Landau is a carriage design with a folding fabric top consisting of two sections supported by external elliptical springs. 

When used in referencing an automobile, landau generally means a simulated convertible. 

The Nash Rambler Landau introduced in 1950 is a cabrio coach with a power-operated fabric top.

A landau bar is an ornamental feature located on a car's rear quarter panel, mostly used on hearses.

Origins 

Carriages that had a fabric top that could be lowered and raised were named "Landau" carriages after the city of Landau in Germany where convertible carriages were first produced.

Thus the name "landau", like many other automobile terms, originates from coachbuilding (since coachbuilders began making motor car bodies instead, and because customers were familiar with coachbuilding terms).

The "landau" described a carriage that featured a manually folding fabric roof that was supported by elliptical springs. The top was designed with separate folding front and rear sections that raised or lowered independently or locked together in the middle to cover the carriage. To differentiate the landau models, the coachbuilders typically included large sidebars.

The automotive equivalent to the horse-drawn landau carriage was not popular, since a forward view was generally insisted upon by passengers. Instead, the more popular body style for automobiles was the landaulet (half-landau), with its covered front seats and open rear seats.

The 1935 handbook of the Society of Automotive Engineers defines the landau as "a closed-type body with provision for opening or folding the rear quarter, by the use of landau joints" and this usually makes it impossible to include quarter glass.

Simulated convertible 

In the 1920s and 1930s, especially in the United States, "landau" became associated with cars where the fixed (eg metal) roof and rear quarter panels were covered with fabric or leather and fitted with S-shaped side landau bars, to make it appear like a convertible roof.

Following the 1920s and 1930s, when custom-built bodies were available with a split front and rear roof design, the use of landau changed from a functional feature on limited production cars to that of a decorative feature in some higher market segment production cars.

The term landau fell into disuse from the mid-1940s until the late-1950s. It was used to describe fixed-roof cars styled to simulate a two-piece roof or to resemble convertibles, sometimes time using vinyl roofs. An example of a two-piece roof is the 1957 Imperial four-door hardtop with simulated "landau-type" roof design. Some models were called "landaus" by their manufacturers, and many were fitted with landau bars on the rear quarters (faux cabriolet).

Landau bar 

A landau bar is an ornamental S-shaped metallic bar installed on the rear quarter panel of a car. Mostly used on hearses, the landau bar represents the folding roof structure on a Landau carriage.

Since the mid-1940s, hearses in the United States commonly feature chrome bow-shaped landau bars on the simulated leather covered rear roof sides.

Nash Rambler Landau 

In 1950, Nash Motors introduced the Rambler, "the first true compact car of the post-World War II era" in a two-door cabrio coach body style called the "Nash Rambler Landau." 

This model was described as a "convertible landau" and the roof section from the top of the windscreen could be retracted into the trunk/boot. A "bridge beam" steel structure remained in place at the top of the doors and windows. No other convertible featured anything like the Nash Rambler Landau with the fabric top that slid back to open along the fixed side rails. The fabric top was power-operated with a cover that could be snapped on when the top was open. The Rambler's strong body structure eliminated the internal bracing that was normally needed on other open roof cars.

Ford Thunderbird Landau 

Ford marketed versions of the Ford Thunderbird using Landau as a model name. The 1962 Landau was a hardtop that included a padded vinyl roof in white or black with simulated S-bars with a raised wing Thunderbird emblem on the C-pillars. This model was popular and contributed to increased sales.

The "Town Landau" model was a model of the 1966 Thunderbird line. It featured a wide rear C-pillar with no rear quarter windows with painted roof or available with a vinyl-covered roof that came in black, white, parchment, or sage gold and included color-coordinated S-bars. 

The Thunderbird was redesigned for 1967 and included a four-door sedan body design with rear-hinged (suicide) doors. All four-door models included a vinyl roof and landau bars giving them the official name of "Landau Sedan". The C-pillar was visually extended into the rear door window area and covered to match the vinyl top, with the landau bars helping camouflage the cut line. The simulated landau design with overwrought trim on the four-door model has been described as "a one-car funeral procession". The Town Landau two-door version was reintroduced as a mid-1977 model with standard luxury features, and it was continued for several more years.

References

See also 
 Landaulet

Car body styles